Sarkal Rural District is a rural district (dehestan) in the Central District of Marivan County, Kurdistan Province, Iran. At the 2006 census, its population (including Kani Dinar, which was subsequently detached from the rural district and promoted to city status) was 22,745, in 5,189 families; excluding Kani Dinar, its population in 2006 was 17,618. in 4,131 families. The rural district has 33 villages.

References 

Rural Districts of Kurdistan Province
Marivan County